Big Bet is an ongoing South Korean streaming television series, directed by Kang Yoon-sung, starring Choi Min-sik, Son Suk-ku, and Lee Dong-hwi. The series revolves around a legendary figure in the Philippines' casino world. It premiered on December 21, 2022 on Disney+ in selected territories and on Hulu in the United States.

A second season with 8 episodes released in February 15, 2023.

Synopsis 
Big Bet tells the story of a man who rises to the top as a casino kingpin in the Philippines but experiences unfortunate events. After being charged for a murder that he did not commit, he faces the ultimate bet with his life on the line to get back in the game.

Cast

Main 
 Choi Min-sik as Cha Mu-sik
Lee Kyu-hyung as young Cha Mu-sik
 A casino mogul whose world turns upside down when he becomes involved in a murder case, leading him back into the gambling scene.
 Son Suk-ku as Oh Seung-hoon
 A cop who is dispatched to the Philippines to handle international criminal cases. He chases Cha Mu-sik to solve the murder case. 
 Lee Dong-hwi as Yang Jeong-pal
 Mu-sik's handler.

Supporting

People around Cha Mu-sik 
Kim Roi-ha as Cha Kyung-deok
 Cha Mu-sik's father.
Bae Hae-sun as Lee Sook-ja
 Cha Mu-sik's mother.
 Jin Seon-kyu as So Jin-seok
 Cha Mu-sik's teacher.

 Jo Han-chul as Kim Gye-jang
 A people who scouted and trained Mu-sik, who wanted to enlist in Marine Corps.

 Lee Moon-sik as Park Jong-hyun
 A detective and Mu-sik's friend.

People in the Casino Bar Korea 
 Heo Dong-won as Lee Sang-cheol
 An employee of Mu-sik's Casino Bar in Daejeon who made gambling game machines
Kim Min-jae as Ahn Chi-young
 President of Daemang Electronics and Mu-sik's partner

National Tax Service staff 
Ryu Hyun-kyung as Kang Min-jung 
 The team leader at National Tax Service

People at casino in Philippines 
 Heo Sung-tae as Seo Tae-seok  
 An illegal business entrepreneur in Korea fled to the Philippines, then made a connection with Mu-sik.
Son Eun-seo as Kim So-jung
 A hotel manager who predicts a subtle relationship with Jeong-pal.
 Lee Hye-young as Chairman Ko
 Casino gamers.

 Kim Hong-pa as Min Seok-joon
 Lee Hae-woo as Phillip
 Casino agent.

Others 
 Im Hyung-joon as Jo Yoon-ki
 A consul dispatched to the Philippines, and he is in constant confrontation with Mu-sik.
Oh Dal-soo as Lee Joon-goo
 The president of the Korean club, he is a bridge connecting Oh Seung-hoon and Korean residents.
 Kim Joo-ryoung as Jin Young-hee
 The owner of a samgyeopsal restaurant in Manila.
 Jeffrey Santos as Jose
Park Ya-seong as Han Seong-il
 A senior in the Iljin who bullies Cha Moo-sik.
Lee Do-gun as Cho Yoon-bae
 A detective who was in charge of the fraud case of Sang-cheon in the past.
 Ho Jo as Han Su-jin
 Cha Mu-sik's ex wife.
 Ryu Sung-hyun as Kim Geun-suk 
 A member of the Busan Yeongdo group.
 Song Young-gyu as Choi Chil-goo 
 CEO of Mindong Construction.
 Jo Jae-yoon
 Jung Woong-in
Hong Ki-joon
Lee Dae-gun
Min Sung-wook
Bembol Roco as Daniel
 Lee Je-hoon
 Epy Quizon as Raul
 The mayor of Caliz

Episodes

Production 
Filming began in February 2022. In May 2022, it was reported that filming was currently taking place in Philippines. In June it was reported that the series recently finished filming in the Philippines and was currently filming in Korea. Filming ended on August 3, 2022.

The series is planned as a two-season and both season consists of eight episodes each.

Release 
The first three episodes was released on December 21, 2022 and the rest was released as one new episode every week. 2-3 weeks after the first season, a second season which also consists of 8 episodes, will be released. It was confirmed that the release of second season will start on February 15, 2023.

Accolades

References

External links 
 
 
 
 Big Bet at Daum 

Gambling in fiction
Korean-language television shows
2022 South Korean television series debuts

South Korean web series
Star (Disney+) original programming
Disney+ original programming
South Korean crime television series
South Korean action television series
Television shows set in the Philippines
Television series by C-JeS Entertainment